Alfred Allen Davey (18 March 1856 – 27 June 1941) was member of the Queensland Legislative Council.

Early life
Davey was born in Sussex, England to Allen Davey and his wife Ann (née Martin).

Political career
Davey was called up to the Queensland Legislative Council in July 1906 and served till the Council was abolished in March 1922.

Personal life
Davey married Matilda Margaret Lobb in London, and together had one child.

He died in June 1941 and was cremated.

References

Members of the Queensland Legislative Council
1856 births
1941 deaths
People from Sussex
English emigrants to Australia